Ursula Reit ( Schedereit; 5 March 1914 – 9 November 1998) also Ursula Reith, was a German television and movie actress, best known for her role as Mrs. Gloop, the mother of Golden Ticket winner Augustus Gloop in Willy Wonka & the Chocolate Factory (1971).

Career

Most of her roles were on German television between 1965 and 1992, when she retired. After retiring, Reith vanished from the public eye. She was said to have died in 1998 from natural causes, although details about her death and personal life are unknown.

Selected filmography
  (1969) - Frau Glasedonner
 Graf Porno und die liebesdurstigen Töchter (1969) - Esmeralda (uncredited)
 Who Laughs Last, Laughs Best (1971) - Margot Krüglein
 Willy Wonka & the Chocolate Factory (1971) - Mrs Gloop
  (1971)
 Paragraph 218 – Wir haben abgetrieben, Herr Staatsanwalt (1971)
 Das bumsfidele Häuschen (1971)
  (1971) - Frau Haftlingrt
 Die liebestollen Apothekerstöchter (1972) - Cook at the clinic (uncredited)
 Eine Armee Gretchen (1973) - Nun Anna (uncredited)
 Mit der Liebe spielt man nicht (1973)
 Three Men in the Snow (1974) - Wondraschek, Telefonistin
 Charley's Nieces (1974) - Krankenschwester (uncredited)
 Oktoberfest! Da kann man fest... (1974) - Frau Kunkera (uncredited)
  (1974) - Accident Witness
 Schulmädchen-Report 9 (1975) - Lilos Mutter (uncredited)
 Schulmädchen-Report 10. Teil (1976) - Seffis Tante (uncredited)
 Rosemary's Daughter (1976) - Internatsleiterin
 Raindrops (1981)
 Pappa Ante Portas (1991) - Bekannte der Familie: Frau Klapproth

References

External links

1914 births
1998 deaths
German film actresses
German television actresses
Actors from Wuppertal
Place of death missing
20th-century German actresses